Charles Beadle (October 27, 1881 – 1944?) was a novelist and pulp fiction writer, best known for his adventure stories in American pulp magazines, and for his novels of the bohemian life in Paris.

He was born at sea. His father, Henry Beadle, was a ship captain, and traveled with his wife Isabelle. Charles grew up in Hackney, in greater London, attending boarding schools. He left home as a teenager and traveled. He served in the British South Africa Police in Southern Rhodesia, doing duty in the Boer War. After the war he traveled up East Africa. He was in Morocco from 1908 to 1912, and began his writing career.

His first known published work was an article, "Our Trip Down the Zambezi," in The Wide World Magazine (May 1907). His first known published fiction was the novel The City of Shadows: A Romance of Morocco (1911). He sailed to New York City, arriving on November 14, 1916. He established himself as a pulp adventure writer, publishing authentic stories of Africa for Adventure, Argosy, Short Stories, The Frontier, etc. He also wrote sea stories.

His most successful work was probably Witch-Doctors, a four-part serial in Adventure (issues of March 15 to May 1, 1919). It was published as a book in 1922, both in the U.S. and London.

By 1920, he was living in Paris, which appears to have been his residence for the rest of his life. He published at least one book, The Esquimau of Montparnasse, on the bohemian scene in Paris.

He is presumed to have died in France, although his date of death is unknown. His last known published work was "Nameless Spy," a ten-page story in Short Stories (June 10, 1947).

Books
The City of Shadows: A Romance of Morocco (Everett & Co.: London, 1911)
A Whiteman's Burden (S. Swift & Co.: London, 1912)
A Passionate Pilgrimage (Heath, Cranton & Ouseley: London, 1915)
Witch-Doctors (Jonathan Cape: London, 1922; Houghton Mifflin: Boston, 1922)
The Blue Rib, etc. (P. Allan & Co.: London, 1927)
The Esquimau of Montparnasse (John Hamilton: London, 1928)
Expatriates at Large (Macauley Company: New York, 1930)
The White Gambit (Palais-Royal Press: Paris, 1933)
Dark Refuge (Obelisk Press: Paris, 1938)
Artist Quarter by "Charles Douglas" (with Douglas Goldring) (Faber & Faber: London, 1941)
The City of Baal (Off-Trail Publications, 2007)
The Land of Ophir (Off-Trail Publications, 2012)

Selected articles
"Our Trip Down the Zambezi," The Wide World Magazine, May 1907.
"A Talk With the New Sultan of Morocco," The Pall Mall Magazine, October 1908.
"My Narrow Escape From a Lioness," Brooklyn Eagle, August 7, 1910.

Selected pulp stories
 "The Christman," Adventure, May 15, 1918.
 "Through Rabat's Eyes" (3-part serial), Argosy, August 2,9,16, 1919.
 "The Alabaster Goddess," Adventure, January 1, 1920.
 "The Land of Ophir" (3-part serial), Adventure, March 10,20,30, 1922.
 "The Lost Cure," Adventure, January 30, 1923.
 "The Mark of the Leopard," Short Stories, May 10, 1926.

References

External links

 
 

1881 births
1940s deaths
Year of death missing
English expatriates in France
English writers
Writers from London
Pulp fiction writers
20th-century British novelists
British short story writers
Maritime writers
British male novelists
British emigrants to the United States
British expatriates in Southern Rhodesia
British expatriates in Morocco
British male short story writers
20th-century British short story writers
20th-century English male writers
British South Africa Police officers
People born at sea